The 35th Junior World Luge Championships took place under the auspices of the International Luge Federation in Oberhof, Germany from 21 to 22 February 2020.

Schedule
Four events were held.

All times are local (UTC+1).

Medalists

Medal table

References

Junior World Luge Championships
Junior World Luge Championships
Junior World Luge Championships
Luge
Sport in Oberhof, Germany
International luge competitions hosted by Germany
Junior World Luge Championships